Margaret of Sweden, also Martha - Swedish: Margareta, Margaretha or Märta/Märtha - may refer to:

Margaret or Martha, Queen consort of Sweden 1298
Margaret, Queen consort 1363 and ruler 1389, also called Margaret the Great
Margaret Leijonhufvud, Queen consort of Sweden 1536
Margaret Fredkulla, Swedish princess, died 1130, Margaret Colleen-of-Peace
Margaret, Swedish princess 1196, daughter of King Sweartgar I, married the Prince of Rügen 
Margaret of Sweden, Queen of Norway, Swedish princess, died 1209
Margaret, Swedish princess, died 1288, daughter of King Waldemar, nun
Margaret, Swedish princess 1448, daughter of King Carl II
Margaret of Denmark, Queen of Scotland, Swedish princess 1457, daughter of King Christian I
Margaret Elizabeth, Princess of Sweden 1580, daughter of King Carl IX (died young)
Margaretha (legal spelling), Princess of Sweden and Norway 1899 
Märtha (legal spelling), Princess of Sweden and Norway 1901
Princess Margaret of Connaught or Margareta (legal spelling after marriage), Crown Princess of Sweden 1907
Margaretha (legal spelling), Princess of Sweden 1934